Tongue Butte is a summit in Sheridan County, Wyoming, in the United States.

References

Mountains of Sheridan County, Wyoming
Mountains of Wyoming